

France
 Obock – 
 Territory of Obock settled by France
 Léonce Lagarde, Commissioner of Obock Territory (1883–1884)
 Riviéres du Sud – Jean-Marie Bayol, Lieutenant-Governor of Riviéres du Sud (1882–1891)
 Senegal -

Portugal
 Angola – Francisco Joaquim Ferreira do Amaral, Governor-General of Angola (1882–1886)

United Kingdom
 India – George Robinson, Viceroy of India (1880–1884)
 Malta Colony – Arthur Borton, Governor of Malta (1878–1884)
 New South Wales – Lord Augustus Loftus, Governor of New South Wales (1879–1885)
 Queensland 
 Sir Arthur Kennedy, Governor of Queensland (1877–1883)
 Sir Anthony Musgrave, Governor of Queensland (1883–1888)
 Tasmania – Major George Strahan, Governor of Tasmania (1881–1886)
 South Australia 
 Lieutenant-General William Jervois, Governor of South Australia (1877–1883)
 Sir William Robinson, Governor of South Australia (1883–1889)
 Victoria – George Phipps, Lord Normanby, Governor of Victoria (1879–1884)
 Western Australia 
 Sir William Robinson, Governor of Western Australia (1880–1883)
 Sir Frederick Broome, Governor of Western Australia (1883–1890)

Colonial governors
Colonial governors
1883